Balakumaran (5 July 1946 – 15 May 2018) was an Indian Tamil writer and author of over 200 novels, 100 short stories, and dialogue/screenplay writer for 23 films. He also contributed to Tamil periodicals such as Kalki, Ananda Vikatan and Kumudam. His notable works as a dialogue writer in Tamil Cinema include Nayakan, Guna, Baashha and Pudhupettai.

Biography
Balakumaran was born in Pazhamarneri village near Thirukattupalli in Thanjavur district on 5 July 1946. He was married to Kamala and Santha. They have daughter Gowri and son Venkataraman aka Surya. He was a disciple of Yogi Ramsurat Kumar. Balakumaran died at the age of 71 due to prolonged illness in a private hospital on 15 May 2018. As a child, he was highly inspired by his mother, who was a Tamil scholar and a Siromani in Sanskrit, used verses of Sangam and other ancient literature to motivate him whenever he was emotionally down. This created a deep interest in Tamil literature which made literature his passion. Despite having a poor relationship with his father due to average academic performance especially Maths, he continued his deep interest in literature with his mother's support. After completing his studies at Wesley High School, he joined a tractor company TAFE in Chennai for a job like any middle class youth. But, with hunger for literature, he quit the job of stenographer in a tractor company and started work on poems first and gradually moved towards short stories & novels. His first stories were published in a literary magazine called 'ka-ca-da-ta-pa-Ra' and for which he was also a founding member of KaChaTaThaPaRa, a self-anointed militant literary journal that had been launched with a mission to blaze new trails in modernist literature and later in Kumudam. Balakumaran's first novel — 'Mercury Pookaal' was serialized in Saavi and his second 'Irumbu Kuthirai' (Iron horse) was serialized in Kalki.

Literary style and themes
Balakumaran's works majorly revolved around woman with great empathy. In his stories, women were not merely gendered cardboard cutouts but fully sentient individuals, with bodies, dreams, desires, yearnings and frustrations. This "legitimisation" of female existence earned him succeeding generations of devoted women readers who resonated with the female characters in his fiction. In an interview, he said that during his initial days in Chennai he spent his life amidst such people. This prompted him to develop a liking for them. Balakumaran had the habit of experiencing characters by himself when writing a book. For instance, In 'Udayar' novel, he had traveled many places where Raja Raja Cholan visited in order to bring closeness towards the novel. Also, he traveled in trucks to longer distance for his 'Irumbu Kuthirai' (Iron horse) novel. In an interview given to The Times of India, he said that after reading Kalki Krishnamurthy's novel Ponniyin Selvan he wondered why it was needed to write a fictional account of the Cholas when there was enough to write about the facts there. "The Raja Raja Chola of Kalki was a different person. He hadn't become the king yet. The Thanjai temple wasn't even in the picture. I went to the Thanjavur district and visited Pallipadai, dedicated to Panchavan Madevi. She was an anukkiyar, a category that is apart from the queens and concubines. She was a friend of Raja Raja Chola I. If you look at the paintings there, each face is unique. Whoever did it, has worked on it with real faces. I did a lot of research for my novel Gangaikonda Chozhan also. But I felt I did that work, visiting those places as a tourist. Udaiyar, a six-part novel, gave me satisfaction as a writer."

Novels written

Udayar
Series about the Great Emperor Raja Raja Cholan, includes the details about how he built Thanjavur district Brihadisvara Temple, Thanjavur and many more. It is a reference to the culture gradient between different kingdoms during Udayar period. 
Mercury Pookkal
Irumbhu Kudhiraigal
Krishna Arjunan
Thayumanavan
Agalya
Kai Veesamma Kai Veesu
Endrendrum Anbudan
Udayar (novel)
Shenbagathottam
Pani Vizhum Malar Vanam
Kadal neelam
Naan Enna Solli Vittaen
Kadarpaalam
Pey Karumbu (on Pattinathaar Swamigal)
Simmasanam (on Kumara Guruparar Swamigal)
Thangakkai (on Seshadiri Swamigal of Thiruvannamalai)
Guru (on Bhagawan Sri Yogi Ram Suratkumar of Thiruvannamalai)
Nigumbalai
Kadalora Kuruvigal
Karaiyora Mudhalaigal
Payanigal Kavanikkavum
Thunai
Meettadha Veenai
Vetrilai Kodi
Manja Kaani
Karnanin Kathai
Shakthi
KatruKondal Kutramillai
En Manathu Thamaraippoo
Kalyana Murungai
Peria Puranak Kathaigal
Kannaadi Koburangal
Kadigai
Ramayanam
Ammavum 10 Katturaigalum
Manam Uruguthey
Appam Vadai Thayirsatham
Ithuthaan Vayathu Kathalikka
Snegamulla Singam
Yeno Theriavillai
kathal Aragam
Neli Mothiram
Ean Mathil Tamarai Poo
Kathalperuman (On Arunagirinathar)
Vilvamaram
Marakal
idharkuth Thane Aasaippattaay Balakumara
Thalaiyanai Pookkal
En Kanmani Thamarai (On Abirami Bhattar)
Thozhan
Gangai Konda Cholan
Avani
Idhu Pothum
Mahabharatham
333 Ammaiyappan Theru
Kanne Vanna Pasungiliye
Brindhavanam (On Shri Ragavendra Swamigal)

Filmography
Balakumaran's contribution to films was largely in the field of screenplay making and dialogue writing. His skills in crafting the dialogue for any conceivable character are noteworthy in Kollywood and his dialogues in Nayakan and Baasha  are still popular and widely used. Surprisingly, he believed movies ware just a means to lift him from the lower middle-class to the upper middle-class. "For a writer of novels, cinema dialogues come easily because our mind has already been conditioned to think while writing novels."

Some of Balakumaran novel names have been used in Tamil cinema as movie titles - Idharkuthane Aasaipattai Balakumara, Irumbu Kuthirai which are samples of Balakumaran's popularity. 

He directed the 1988 K. Bhagyaraj starrer film 'Idhu Namma Aalu'.

List of the films to which Balakumaran contributed:
Writer
Nayakan (1987)
Guna (1991)
Shenbagathottam (1991)
Gentleman (1993)
Kadhalan (1994)
Kizhakku Malai (1995)
Ragasiya Police (1995)
Baasha (1995)
Sivasakthi (1996)
Ullaasam (1997)
Velai (1998)
Jeans (1998)
Mugavaree (2000)
Uyirile Kalanthathu (2000)
Citizen (2001)
Majnu (2001)
Kadhal Sadugudu (2003)
Adhu (2004)
Jananam (2004)
Manmadhan (2004)
Vallavan (2006)
Pudhupettai (2006)

Literary works
Epic on Rajendra Cholan
Monthly Novels on various themes..

Awards

Literary Awards won  :
Irumbu Kudhiraigal – Raja Sir Annamalai Chettiyar Trust Awards
Mercury Pookal – Illakkiya Sindhanai Awards
Kadarpalam – State Award (II Prize) (Short Story Collection)
Sugajeevanam – State Award (I Prize) (short story collection)
Cinema Awards Won :
Guna – Cinema Express Award
Kaadalan – Tamil Nadu State Film Award for Best Dialogue Writer
Other Awards :
Honoured with "Sindhanai Chemmal" title (From Lions Club Madras)
 Kalaimaamani Award from Government of Tamil Nadu

See also
 List of Indian writers

References

External links 
Official Site
Official Blog
Balakumaran Thoughts

1946 births
2018 deaths
Tamil-language writers
Tamil screenwriters
Indian male novelists
People from Thanjavur district
20th-century Indian novelists
Indian male short story writers
Screenwriters from Tamil Nadu
20th-century Indian short story writers
Novelists from Tamil Nadu
20th-century Indian male writers